Seemi is both a given name and a surname. It may refer to:

Farhat Seemi, Pakistani politician, Member of the Provincial Assembly of Sindh
Seemi Aizdi, Pakistani politician and the member-elect of the Senate of Pakistan
Seemi Ezdi, member of Senate of Pakistan
Seemi Pasha, Pakistani film and television actress
Seemi Raheel, Pakistani senior actress working in Urdu television

See also 
Simi (disambiguation)
Symi